Frank Castorf (born 17 July 1951 in East Berlin) is a German theater director and was the artistic director of the Volksbühne am Rosa-Luxemburg-Platz from 1992 to 2015. His work is often associated with postdramatic theatre.

Biography

Early Years
Castorf's father was an ironmonger.   Frank Castorf successfully completed his schooling in 1969/70, entering training for railway work.   Between 1970 and 1972 he undertook military service with the army's National Border Force.

Then, between 1971 and 1976, he attended the Humboldt University of Berlin, studying theatrology.  His teachers included Ernst Schumacher, Rudolf Münz and Joachim Fiebach.   His diploma dissertation, which was formally commended, was entitled "Ground Rules for the 'Development' of Ionesco's Global Ideological Perspective and Artistic-Aesthetic Position".   He made numerous culturally focused visits to Poland during this period.

In 1989, Klaus Pierwoß brought Castorf with a production of Hamlet to Schauspiel Köln, Cologne.

In 2013, he directed a "deliberately incoherent" production of the Ring Cycle at the Bayreuth Wagner Festival, which was booed by the audience.

References

Literature

Secondary material
 Hans-Thies Lehmann: Postdramatic Theatre. translated and with an introduction by Karen Jübs-Munby, Routledge, London and New York 2006, .

External links 
Official Volksbühne website (in German)
Goethe-Institut website about Castorf

1951 births
German theatre directors
Postmodern theatre
Members of the Academy of Arts, Berlin
Living people
People from East Berlin
Recipients of the Order of Merit of Berlin